The Mao'ershan National Forest Park is a national forest park located in Yanji, Jilin, China. Located in the southern suburbs of Yanji, it is bordered by the Buerhatong River and Hailan River.

History
In November 1992 it was classified as a "National Forest Park" by the State Forestry Administration.

See also
 List of protected areas of China

References

Parks in Yanbian
Tourist attractions in Yanbian